The Highlands and Islands League is an amateur women's association football league in Scotland, run by Scottish Women's Football (SWF). Founded in 2019, the league sits outside the current Scottish Women's Football League pyramid. It comprises nine teams: one based in Caithness, two in Orkney, one in Moray, two in Sutherland, one in Nairnshire and two in Inverness-shire.

History
In September 2018, a proposal to create a women's Highlands and Islands League for 2019 was ratified by Scottish Women's Football (SWF). On 25 February 2019, SWF officially announced the creation of the new league. The inaugural season ran from March to October, with each team playing 12 games, and was won by Clachnacuddin. The 2020 season was cancelled due to the COVID-19 pandemic.

Clubs

2022 season
The following nine teams are competing in the Highlands and Islands League during the 2022 season:

Former clubs

Seasons

Highlands and Islands League Cup
The Cup competition began in the 2019 season, along with the foundation of the Highlands and Islands League. Lewis and Harris won the first edition.

References

External links
Scottish Women's Football

Women's football leagues in Scotland
Summer association football leagues
2019 establishments in Scotland